Edwin John "Eddie" Holding (15 October 1930 – 9 February 2014) was an English footballer and manager.

Career
Holding was a versatile right-back who netted six goals in 39 third division (south) outings while for Walsall, prior to joining Barrow in July 1954, and then Northampton Town, Nuneaton Borough, Lockheed Leamington, Evesham United and Brierley Hill. He lived near Walsall in retirement.

Managerial statistics

References

External links
 

1930 births
2014 deaths
Footballers from Wolverhampton
English footballers
Association football defenders
Walsall F.C. players
Barrow A.F.C. players
Northampton Town F.C. players
Nuneaton Borough F.C. players
Leamington F.C. players
Evesham United F.C. players
Brierley Hill Alliance F.C. players
English Football League players
English football managers
Tamworth F.C. managers